Eduard Arranz Bravo, stylized Eduard Arranz-Bravo, with a dash, (in Spanish: Eduardo) is a Catalan Spanish painter born in Barcelona in 1941.

Life
Arranz-Bravo studied at the San Jorge Fine Arts School in Barcelona from 1959 to 
1962.

In 1961, he held his first individual exhibition, "15 paintings by Arranz", in the Club Universitario de Barcelona. The exhibition that brought him recognition from the Barcelona critics was that organized by the Centre de Cultura Contemporània de Barcelona in 1962. Between 1968 and 1970, he was part of a group of artists  consisting of Gerard Sala, Robert Llimós and Rafael Bartolozzi Lozano (Rafael Lozano Bartolozzi), with whom he continued to collaborate  until 1982, alternating between collective and individual exhibitions. His contact with these artists influenced his early work. Arranz-Bravo's early work was abstract and moved towards new figuration and pop art. All the  artists, however, continued with their own work at the same time.

He worked for a time together with Bartolozzi on different murals and exhibits, including the murals covering various façades of the Tipel factory in  Parets del Vallès (1968), the ones at a hotel establishment in Magalluf, Mallorca (1973), the mural on the façade of the Barcelona International Centre of Photography (1978), still visible in the Raval District today, and the one at Camilo José Cela's home on Mallorca (1979).

They also took part in joint exhibitions held at the Bleu Gallery in Stockholm (1971), where his Tauromaquias series was presented, Sketches and marble sculptures, at the Gaspar Gallery in Barcelona (1973, 1977 and 1979), at the Vandrés Gallery in Madrid (1975 and 1980) and at the Tinell Exhibition Centre in Barcelona (1979): Mides universals (Universal Sizes).

They  also organized events, published books, sculptures and wooden structures.

In 1981 he had his first individual exhibit. In 1982, he presented  his series Abraçades (Embraces) at the Miguel Marcos gallery in Zaragoza and in 1983, had a retrospective at the Gaspar Exhibition Centre in Barcelona. Between 1986 and 1988 he created a series of lithographs called La casa, he painted the Pantocràtor, and worked as artistic director in the films by Jaime Camino El balcón abierto and Luces y sombras.

He took part in the Eighth Salón de Mayo / Saló de Maig (at the old Santa Creu Hospital in Barcelona, 1964) and in the exhibitions Muestra de Arte Nuevo (MAN, Barcelona 1971); Picasso 90 (Louvre Museum, 1971), Experiencias conceptuales (Escola Eina in Barcelona, 1971–72), Miró 80 (Mallorca 1973–74), Artistas de Cataluña. Entre el Dau al Set y los conceptuales (Santillana del Mar, 1974), 15 años de la Casa del siglo XV (Segovia, 1978), Els artistes i el seu pas per Eina (Trece de Barcelona Gallery, 1980) and Mosaico 1983 (Madrid), among others. From 1986 to 1988 he exhibited in several cities in Spain and abroad, such as Madrid, Amsterdam, Paris and Rio de Janeiro. In 1989 he presented an exhibition of his work of the previous three years at the Museum of Modern Art in São Paulo and a retrospective at Palau Robert in Barcelona.

In 1992 he held a retrospective at the Imperial Palace of Rio de Janeiro, when the only other Spanish artists to exhibit there previously had been Pablo Picasso and Joan Miró. He also exhibited at the Pavilion of Catalonia at the World Expo in Seville.

In 1998 he had his first exhibition at the Franklin Bowles Galleries in New York, where he began an intense collaboration with this gallery, which introduced his work around the world.
Exhibitions in Barcelona, Segovia, Bilbao and Bad Honnef. He presents the Faith series at the Reina Sofia National Art Center Museum in Madrid. He exhibits again in Germany, this time in Freiburg. He created the set for From the Cradle to the Chair by the Bench, by Martí Peraferrer at the Sala Muntaner in Barcelona.

In 2010 He holds his annual exhibitions at the Franklin Bowles Galleries in San Francisco and New York. He also exhibits in Rome, at the Edieuropa Gallery, as well as in the city of Barcelona, at the Àmbit Gallery and at the Vall d’Hebron Hospital. At the same time, the Arranz-Bravo Foundation organizes the thematic exhibitions, Arranz-Bravo: Impacts and Arranz-Bravo. Self-portraits.

In 2014 is his first exhibition in China, by the Liu Fine Arts Gallery. At the same time, he also held his first solo exhibition in Moscow. Two years later he exhibited at the Cervantes Institute in Moscow as well as at the Franklin Bowles Galleries in New York and San Francisco. The Arranz-Bravo Foundation organizes Arranz-Bravo. Drawing in action, a review of the uses and techniques used in the discipline of drawing.

In 2020, the restoration of the painting of the Tipel Factory in Parets del Vallès is completed, which began in the summer of 2019.

Work (Description)
In his early figurative work and neo-figurative work after 1967, he tried to represent modern day man 
with his problems, fears, isolation, worries and repressions. 
He also participated in the 39th Venice Biennale in 1980 and he has received several awards. He has made marble, bronze and ceramic sculptures, some of which he presented in the Gaspar Exhibition Centre 
in Barcelona in 1983. His work L'acodillora (1985) stands on the Rambla of L'Hospitalet de Llobregat.
He has received, among other awards, that of the Second Bienal Internacional del Deporte; the Figure award in the Biennial Estrada Saladich, and the Inglada-Guillot award for Drawing.

Museums and collections 
His works are part of many different collections at private and public institutions, and many are exhibited to the public. Some prime locations of his works are at his namesake Museum, the Arranz-Bravo Foundation (Fundació Arranz-Bravo) in L'Hospitalet de Llobregat, which holds a total of 340 of his works (at January 2022), between canvas paintings, drawings and paintings on paper, and various sculptures, though only a small selection are exhibited at a time the Barcelona Museum of Contemporary Art (Museu d'Art Contemporani de Barcelona – MACBA), Spain's National Reina Sofia Art Centre (modern & contemporary art) in Madrid (Museo Nacional Centro de Arte Reina Sofía), the Fine Arts Museum of Vitoria-Gasteiz, the São Paulo Museum of Modern Art, and the Fine Arts Museum of Seville, among other museums and exhibit spaces.

Works in public spaces 
The Catalan artist has various murals and sculptures on view in the public space, some of the former that are still viewable include murals in Barcelona's Raval district, Parets del Vallès, painted in collaboration with Rafael Bartolozzi Lozano (Pamplona 1943 – Tarragona 2009), and L'Hospitalet. Two of his sculptures are in L'Hospitalet de Llobregat as well: L'Acollidora (≈ The Welcomer), on Rambla Just Oliveras, and El pont de la llibertat (Liberty Bridge), at the rotunda on Rambla de la Marina at its confluence with Avinguda del Carrilet.

In addition, in autumn 2019, this Spanish artist designed the hull art for Norwegian Cruise Line's Norwegian Encore ship, which was launched in Miami in November 2019 .

List of institutions with his work 
The following is a list of places where his work is held, probably incomplete:

Works in Spain 
 Catalonia
 Museu Nacional d'Art de Catalunya (MNAC), Barcelona
 Museu d'Art Contemporani de Barcelona (MACBA), Barcelona
 Fundació La Caixa, Barcelona
 Fundació Josep Suñol, Barcelona
 Fundació Vila Casas – Museu Can Framis, Barcelona
 Fundació Fran Daurel, Barcelona
 Museu de L'Hospitalet, L’Hospitalet de Llobregat
 Museu d'Art Modern de Tarragona (Tarragona Art Museum), Tarragona
 Fundació Carmen & Lluís Bassat, Mataró
 etc.

 Rest of Spain
 Museu d'Art Contemporani Vicent Aguilera Cerní de Vilafamés (Vicent Aguilera Cerní Contemporary Art Museum of Vilafamés), in the Valencian Land
 Museo Nacional Centro de Arte Reina Sofía (MNCARS), Madrid
 Museo de Arte Contemporaneo de Madrid, municipal museum in Madrid
 Museo de Bellas Artes de Vitoria-Gasteiz (Victoria-Gasteiz Fine Arts Museum, in the Basque Country)
 Museo de Bellas Artes de Sevilla (Seville Fine Arts Museum), in Andalusia)
 Centro Atlántico de Arte Moderno, Las Palmas de Gran Canaria, Canary Islands
 etc.

Rest of Europe 
 Royal Museum of Fine Arts, Brussels, Belgium
 Procter & Gamble, Belgium
 Haus der Kunst, Munich, Germany
 Olympic Museum, Lausanne, Switzerland
 Amsterdam Opera House, The Netherlands
 Getty Collection, UK
 Tretyakov State Gallery, Moscow, Russia
 etc.

North America 
 Regent Seven Seas Cruises, USA
 Franklin Bowles Gallery, New York, NY
 Buhl Collection, New York, NY
 Toyo Bank, New York, NY
 Skidmore Art Museum, Saratoga Springs, New York
 Frank del Rio, Miami, Florida 
 ChemRisk, San Francisco, California
 Weisscomm Partners, San Francisco, California
 etc.

Rest of the World 
 The Art Museum, Ashdod, Israel
 Yomanouchi Edition, Japan
 Ritz Carlton Pacific Place, Jakarta, Indonesia
 JW Marriot, Jakarta, Indonesia
 etc.

See also 
 Arranz-Bravo Foundation
 Rafael Bartolozzi Lozano

References

External links 
 Arranz-Bravo Foundation (EN, CA, ES), in l'Hospitalet de Llobregat

1941 births
Living people
Painters from Barcelona
Artists from Catalonia